This is a list of the episodes of the shōjo anime series Kimi ni Todoke, directed by Hiro Kaburagi and produced by Production I.G. The episodes are based on the Kimi ni Todoke manga series by Karuho Shiina. Series composition is led by Tomoko Konparu, with character designs being provided by Yuka Shibata. For season 1, the opening theme music,  is by Tomofumi Tanizawa, and the ending,  is by Chara. For season 2, the opening,  is also by Tomofumi Tanizawa, release date 02/23/2011.  The ending theme,  is by May's.

The series will be released to Region 2 DVD in Japan with three episodes per disc, starting on December 23, 2009. NIS America later released the series from Volume 1 through Volume 3 alongside Natsume's Book of Friends seasons 1 and 2 on February 4, 2014.

A second season was announced in the November 2010 issue of Betsuma magazine and was airing on NTV, starting from 4 January to 30 March 2011.

Episode list

Season 1

Season 2

Notes

DVD releases
The first DVD compilation for the series was released on December 23, 2009, with one scheduled for each month until the series is complete. The first 5 volumes have 3 episodes each, the sixth volume has 4 episodes, and the remaining two volumes have 3 episode each.

References

External links
 Official Anime Site 
 

Kimi ni Todoke